72nd Brigade may refer to:
 72nd Brigade for Special Operations (Serbia)
 72nd Brigade (Slovenian Armed Forces)
 72nd Mechanized Brigade (Ukraine)
 72nd Brigade (United Kingdom)
 72nd Indian Infantry Brigade
 72nd Field Artillery Brigade (United States)
 72nd Infantry Brigade Combat Team (United States)